This article is about the particular significance of the year 1867 to Wales and its people.

Incumbents

Lord Lieutenant of Anglesey – Henry Paget, 2nd Marquess of Anglesey 
Lord Lieutenant of Brecknockshire – Charles Morgan, 1st Baron Tredegar
Lord Lieutenant of Caernarvonshire – Edward Douglas-Pennant, 1st Baron Penrhyn 
Lord Lieutenant of Cardiganshire – Edward Pryse
Lord Lieutenant of Carmarthenshire – John Campbell, 2nd Earl Cawdor 
Lord Lieutenant of Denbighshire – Robert Myddelton Biddulph    
Lord Lieutenant of Flintshire – Sir Stephen Glynne, 9th Baronet 
Lord Lieutenant of Glamorgan – Christopher Rice Mansel Talbot 
Lord Lieutenant of Merionethshire – Edward Lloyd-Mostyn, 2nd Baron Mostyn
Lord Lieutenant of Monmouthshire – Benjamin Hall, 1st Baron Llanover (until 27 April); Henry Somerset, 8th Duke of Beaufort (from 21 May)
Lord Lieutenant of Montgomeryshire – Sudeley Hanbury-Tracy, 3rd Baron Sudeley
Lord Lieutenant of Pembrokeshire – William Edwardes, 3rd Baron Kensington
Lord Lieutenant of Radnorshire – John Walsh, 1st Baron Ormathwaite

Bishop of Bangor – James Colquhoun Campbell
Bishop of Llandaff – Alfred Ollivant 
Bishop of St Asaph – Thomas Vowler Short 
Bishop of St Davids – Connop Thirlwall

Events
3 June – The opening of the Anglesey Central Railway to passenger traffic links Amlwch to the rail network for the first time.
19 August – The Victoria pier at Rhyl, built at a cost of £23,000, opens to the public.
2 September – The Carnarvonshire Railway opens throughout, connecting Carnarvon and Portmadoc.
30 September – Mawddwy Railway opens.
10 October – Barmouth Bridge across the Mawddach estuary opens to rail traffic, linking Barmouth to the rail network for the first time.
26–27 October – Barque Earl of Chester is wrecked off Rhosneigr, Anglesey, with the loss of at least 17 lives.
8 November – 178 miners are killed in an accident at Ferndale Colliery, Rhondda.
date unknown
Celtic Congress held at Saint-Brieuc in Brittany.
The Bronze Age cairns at Llanmadoc Hill are excavated and finds recorded.

Arts and literature

Awards
At the National Eisteddfod of Wales held at Carmarthen, a crown is presented for the first time.

New books
Rhoda Broughton – Cometh Up as a Flower
Edward Hamer – The Chartist Outbreak at Llanidloes
Jabez Edmund Jenkins – Egin Awen, yn cynnwys awdlau, cywyddau
Charles Octavius Swinnerton Morgan - Penhow Castle
William Thomas (Islwyn) – Caniadau
Alfred Russel Wallace – The Malay Archipelago
Charles Wilkins – The History of Merthyr Tydfil

Music
David Roberts (Alawydd) – Llyfr y Psalmau

Sport
Boxing – The "Marquess of Queensberry rules", formulated by John Graham Chambers, are published.

Births
10 March
Sir William James Thomas, 1st baronet, philanthropist, one of the Thomas baronets of Yapton (d. 1945)
William Llewelyn Williams, politician (d. 1922)
10 April – Courtenay Morgan, 1st Viscount Tredegar, peer (d. 1934)
2 May – Eliseus Williams (Eifion Wyn), poet (d. 1926)
13 May – Frank Brangwyn, artist (d. 1956)
15 May – Sir Henry Stuart Jones, academic (d. 1939)
21 May – John Thomas Job, poet (d. 1938)
26 May – Mary of Teck, member of the British royal family, Princess of Wales 1901–1910 (d. 1953)
29 September – John Richard Williams (J.R. Tryfanwy), poet (d. 1924)
6 October – Rosser Evans, Wales international rugby player
12 October – Lyn Harding, actor (d. 1952)
2 November – Owen Glynne Jones, mountaineer (d. 1899)
28 November – James Richard Atkin, judge (born in Australia) (d. 1944)
18 December – David Watts Morgan, Member of Parliament for Rhondda East (d. 1933) 
date unknown
Mia Arnesby Brown, born Mia Sarah H. Edwards, painter of children's portraits (d. 1931)
Fred Hutchinson, rugby player (d. 1941)

Deaths
15 February – Walter Coffin, industrialist, 82
18 February – Edward Roberts (Iorwerth Glan Aled), poet, 48
27 April – Benjamin Hall, 1st Baron Llanover, industrialist, 64
26 May – Thomas Phillips, politician and businessman, 65/66
4 August – William Crawshay II, industrialist, 79
9 September – John Propert, physician, 74
12 September – Robert Fulke Greville, landowner and politician, 67
16 November – Thomas Aubrey, Methodist minister, 59
1 December – William Thomas, Guardian of Aborigines in Australia, 74

References

Wales